Cordelia A. Greene Library is an American association library located in Castile, New York. Founded in 1897, it was named in honor of Cordelia A. Greene, M.D. who donated the land upon which it was built.

History
Mrs. Judge Clark, of Chicago, a former patient and long-time friend, once told Greene that her patients desired to make her the recipient of a testimonial that would be a lasting evidence of their appreciation. Greene was deeply moved and replied that nothing would please her more than to see her townspeople enjoying the privilege of a free library. After Mrs. Clark's decease, her daughter, Miss Kate Clark, while at the Castile Sanitarium, in 1896, formed the Cordelia A. Greene Library Building Association. The charter and honorary members were chosen from the patients and women of Castile. The news was sent to Greene, who was then in the Hawaiian Islands.

The Cordelia A. Greene Library formally opened on March 9, 1897, with Frances Willard presiding at the ceremony. It was housed temporarily in one half of the first floor of the town hall, for the permanent use of which Greene paid . The nucleus of this library consisted of the 500 volumes of the Scribner "model library" and about 200 other volumes, the use of which was given to the public through the good will of Greene. 

In July 1898, it was incorporated under the laws of the state and was legally known as the "Cordelia A. Greene Library of Castile, New York".

The library association collected voluntary donations towards a building. As the site opposite the Castile Sanitarium, which Greene founded, was considered the most desirable and appropriate for a new building, Greene presented the library association with a deed of the land for this purpose.

Architecture and fittings
On August 11, 1902, the cornerstone of the Cordelia A. Greene Library was laid. A sealed copper box, containing a history of the library association, as well as valuable papers and records, were placed in the stone by Greene. The building was designed by Otto Block, of Rochester, New York. Fred Gleason, of that city was the contractor. The one-story building was constructed of red brick, and laid in colored mortar, with blue stone trimmings.

The interior was divided into two rooms, a ready room and stock room, a large arch making the division. These room were 14 feet high. The librarian's desk was placed so that it overlooked the entire interior. The vestibule provides and entrance and cloak room. All windows were placed 3 feet from the floor, thusallowing more book room. The floors were all of tile, the vestibule bordered with marble. A fire place and a furnace provided heat for the building. Electric wiring was put in ready for use when the power could be secured. The stone was from the quarries of the American Blue Stone Company at Rock Glen, and the brick from the Attica yards.

The new building was formally dedicated on December 24, 1902. With construction completed, a transfer of the books was made. Greene spent hundreds of dollars beautifying the grounds with lawns, ponds, and a fountain, and provided a boat for children. The adjacent grove extending into a park was given to the children for a playground.

Notes

References

External links
 Official website

Public libraries in New York (state)
Buildings and structures in Wyoming County, New York
1897 establishments in New York (state)